Ridha Touzi is an electrical engineer at the Canada Centre for Remote Sensing in Ottawa, Ontario. He was named a Fellow of the Institute of Electrical and Electronics Engineers (IEEE) in 2015 for his contributions to the design and calibration of polarimetric synthetic aperture radar.

References 

Fellow Members of the IEEE
Living people
Year of birth missing (living people)
Place of birth missing (living people)